Batmönkhiin Sarantuyaa (born 20 April 1970), known mononymously as Sarantuya or simply Saraa, is a Mongolian mezzo-soprano singer who has been a major figure in the pop music scene of the Mongol people since the late 1980s. She is still very popular among the Mongolian population, and is recognized as the queen of Mongolian pop music. Saraa is the highest-selling Mongolian artist of all time, with hits like "Torson Odriin Bayar", "Bi Jargaltai", "Argagui Amrag", and others. 

Saraa was born in Ulaanbaatar, and started off singing in a small band called "Mungun Harandaa" (translated as "Silver Pencil"). Her first solo live-concert, named "Setgeliin Khug",  was in 1994 with 1325 fans in attendance. Throughout her career, she has released total of 15 studio albums.

Awards 
Known as the "Pop Diva", Saraa was named "Singer of the Century" - an unprecedented honor for a Mongolian. She has also received numerous other awards, one of which is "Best Artist" from Pentatonic, a mainstream music festival held annually.

Personal life 
Saraa's mother is of Yakut descent. Saraa is divorced and has two children, a son and daughter. She was once married to Boldkhuyag, a Golomt Bank executive.

Discography

References

21st-century Mongolian women singers
20th-century Mongolian women singers
Mongolian people of Yakut descent
1970 births
Living people
People from Ulaanbaatar
Honored Artists of Mongolia